Central High School, also known as Central-Macon, Central-Bibb, and Central Fine Arts and International Baccalaureate Magnet High School, is a high school in Macon, Georgia, United States, serving students in grades 9–12. It is a unit of the Bibb County School District.

Notable alumni

This section also includes notable alumni from Lanier and Miller High Schools, which combined in 1970 to form the present Central High School.
 Samaria (Mitcham) Bailey, first American female of African descent to attend the school; went on to be an entrepreneur; CEO of Med Tech Services, Inc.
 John Morrison Birch, missionary considered by some to be the first victim of the Cold War; the conservative John Birch Society, formed 13 years after his death, is named in his honor
 Neil Callaway, offensive line coach for the USC Trojans
 Jay Carson, advisor to politicians such as Bill Clinton, Hillary Clinton, and Howard Dean
 Manley Lanier "Sonny" Carter, Jr., astronaut and soccer player
 Cecil O. De Loach, Jr., winemaker, viticulturalist, founder of De Loach Vineyards, Sonoma County, California
 Tony Gilbert, University of Georgia and NFL football player for the Atlanta Falcons
 Watts Gunn, golfer
 Bob Hendley, former professional baseball player (Milwaukee Braves, San Francisco Giants, Chicago Cubs, New York Mets)
Sasha Hutchings, musical theatre actress, singer, and dancer; was in the original Broadway cast of Hamilton
 Roger Jackson, football player
 Tom Johnson, former president of CNN and the Los Angeles Times
 Ellamae Ellis League, architect from Macon, first woman FAIA from Georgia
 Carrie Preston, actress (My Best Friend's Wedding, The Legend of Bagger Vance, Person of Interest)
 Bernard Ramsey, Merrill Lynch executive and philanthropist; largest single donor to University of Georgia
 Theron Sapp, University of Georgia and NFL football player
 General Robert Lee Scott, Jr., author of the book God is My Co-Pilot, later made into a film of the same name
 Vernon "Catfish" Smith, All-American football player at the University of Georgia
 Hamp Tanner, football player
 J.T. Thomas, Florida State and NFL football player for the Pittsburgh Steelers
 Ronnie Thompson, first Republican to be elected mayor of Macon; served from 1967 to 1975; gospel singer
 Coot Veal, former professional baseball player (Detroit Tigers, Washington Senators, Pittsburgh Pirates)
 Alan Walden, co-founder of Capricorn Records; former manager of Lynyrd Skynyrd and Outlaws
 Phil Walden, co-founder of Capricorn Records; manager of Otis Redding and The Allman Brothers Band

References

External links
 

Public high schools in Georgia (U.S. state)
Schools in Macon, Georgia
Magnet schools in Georgia (U.S. state)
1870 establishments in Georgia (U.S. state)